NJK may refer to:
Norwegian Railway Club
Nyländska Jaktklubben